Mān Ye-su, also known as Man Ye-su, is a village in Hopang District, Wa Self-Administered Division of Myanmar.

Geography
Mān Ye-su is located in the mountainous area near the border with China, which lies at Mong Ling Shan mountain, about 4 km to the east.

See also
Wa States

References

External links
The border area (Wa region)

Populated places in Shan State
Wa people